The 2013 Maui Invitational Tournament was an early-season college basketball tournament played from November 15 to November 27, 2013. It was the 30th annual holding of the Maui Invitational Tournament, which began in 1984, and was part of the 2013–14 NCAA Division I men's basketball season. The Championship Round was played at the Lahaina Civic Center in Maui, Hawaii from November 25 to 27.

Bracket

Opening Round
The Opening Round was played on November 15–19 at various sites around the country.

November 15
Arkansas 76, Louisiana-Lafayette 63 in Fayetteville, AR
California 64, Oakland 60 in Berkeley, CA

November 16
Dayton 78, St. Francis Brooklyn 58 in Dayton, OH

November 17
Baylor 87, Louisiana-Lafayette 68 in Waco, TX
Gonzaga 82, Oakland 67 in Spokane, WA

November 18
Syracuse 56, St. Francis Brooklyn 50 in Syracuse, NY

November 19
Minnesota 82, Coastal Carolina 72 in Minneapolis, MN

Regional Round

* Games played at HTC Center in Conway, South Carolina

Championship Round
The Championship Round occurred from November 25–27 at Lahaina Civic Center in Maui, Hawaii.

References

Maui Invitational Tournament
Maui Invitational
Maui Invitational